The Sexual Freedom Awards is an annual British event that honours achievement in the sexuality and erotica industries worldwide.

Founded in 1994 by campaigner Tuppy Owens, the awards were first called the "Erotic Oscars", until the name had to be changed for legal reasons. They were called the "Erotic Awards" from 2002 until 2013 when they become what is now known as the Sexual Freedom Awards.  The awards ceremony is an annual event in London with a semi-finals event and the finals held at the "Sex Maniacs Ball" but now is a fully fledged award night in its own right. The Leydig Trust organise these events which raise funds for the "Outsiders Club", a charity that supports disabled people to find partners.

The Erotic Awards had twenty-one award categories including "Campaigner", "Sex Worker", "Striptease Artist", "Fashion", "Academic", "Writer", and "Film". Nominations come from the public, and three finalists in each category are then selected by the "Grand Jury of Conspicuous Sensuality". The winners are announced during the ceremony, where the finalists' work is also exhibited and performed. All award winners receive the Erotic Awards’ signature trophy, the "Flying Penis".

Past winners

1994
Best Erotic Publication - Journal of Erotica
Most Pleasurable Erotic Gadget - Get Wet's Silicone Dildos
Best Erotic Writer - Carol A. Queen
Best Erotic Film/Video - The Cement Garden
Campaigner for Sexual Freedom - Nettie Pollard
Most Exciting Innovation - Cyber SM
Best Erotic Artist - Tracy Gilroy
Best Erotic Photographer - Housk Randall
Most Courageous British Public Figure - Peter Tatchell
Best Up and Coming Clothes Designer - Kate Mitchell
Most Sexually Liberating Film/Video - Self Loving
Most Erotic British TV Show - Hookers, Hustlers, Pimps & their Johns
Best Safer Sex Campaign - AIDS Helpline (Health Education Authority)
Lifetime Achievement - Derek Jarman
Artist of the Year - Monica Guevara

1995
Publication of the Year - Scenario Magazine
Sex Product - Kegelciser
Erotic Photographer - Giles Berquet
Erotic Artist - Monica Guevara
Erotic Writer - Marilyn Hacker
Erotic Book - Rituals of Love - Sexual Experiments, Erotic Possibilities
Special Award - Safer Sexy - The Guide to Gay Sex Safely
Performance Artist - Franco B.
Erotic Film/Video - Torture Garden
Erotic Body Art/Artist - Simon & Tota
Sexiest Celebrity - Jilly Gooldon
Campaigners for Sexual Freedom - Roland Jaggard/Colin Lasky/Tony Brown
Up-and-coming Clothes Designer - Anela Takach
Erotic Event - Smut Fest
Lifetime Achievement - Anthony Grey
Shock Horror Award, for disasters for our sexual freedom - Criminal Justice Act

1996
Sex Worker - Bella Lamu
Erotic Publication - The Organ
Erotic Photographer - China Hamilton
Erotic Artist - Red Hot Metal
Erotic Writer - Piglet
Clothes Designer - Gaile McConaghie
Film/Video/Computer Game - The Reality Harness
Erotic Club/Event - Tribal Rhythms
Campaigner for Sexual Freedom - Mark Dyer
Campaigner of the Year - Chad Varah CBE
Innovation - Fetters elastic mesh mask
Special Awards - Chad Varah & David Webb

1997
Female Sex Worker - Lucy Demeanour
Male Sex Worker - Sleazy Michael
Erotic Publication - 3rd Illustrated Anthology Of Erotica
Erotic Photographer - Trevor Watson
Erotic Artist/Illustrator - Paula Meadows
Erotic Writer - Pan Pantziarka
Erotic Performer - Jeremy Robins
Clothes Designer - E. Garbs
Erotic Film/Video - Butt Buddies
Erotic Club/Event - Whiplash Summer Pleasure Zone
Innovation - Liquid Latex
Campaigner for Sexual Freedom - Rob Grover
Stripper - Roxi
Special Award - Peter & Jenny

1998
Striptease Artist (Female) - Charlie
Striptease Artist (Male) - Rumpshaker
Publication - Flirt!
Photographer - Mike Lake-McMillan
Artist/illustrator - Jon Blake
Writer - William Levy
Performance Artist - Angels of Disorder
Clothes Designer - Surrender
Club Or Event - Glasgow Hellfire Club & Wedding
Film Or Video - Kama Sutra
Innovation - Plug-in Tail
Campaigner - Nicky Akehurst
Lifetime Achievement - Kathy Acker
 Lifetime Achievement - Deborah Ryder

1999
Artist - Shin Taga
Campaigner for Sexual Freedom - Tim Summers
Designer - Birgit Gebhardt (Deadly Glamour)
Craftsmaster - Alex Jacob
Video - Annie Sprinkle's Herstory of Porn
TV Documentary - Susie Bright's SexPest
Event / Club - Endorfiends
Lifetime Achievement - Berth Milton Sr.
Performance Artist - Diamond Lil
Photographer - Dahmane
International Performance Artist - Kim Airs
Publication - Fetish Times European
Publication - Libido
Sex Worker - Samantha
Striptease Artist (Female) - Katrina Colvert
Outsiders Award - Penny Boot

2000
Artist - Julian Snelling
Campaigner for Sexual Freedom - Tim Hopkins
Clothes Designer - Basil Vague
Craftmaster - B&C
Film/Video - Ecstatic Moments
Event/Club - Fun 4 Two
Innovation - Roissy Travelling Dungeon
Performance Artist - Rockbitch
Photographer - Roy Stuart
Publication - Deviant Desires - Incredibly Strange Sex
Striptease artist (Female) - Arlette
Striptease artist (Male) - Bronze
Website - Fetish-net
Writer - Athena Douris
Outsiders Award - Michael Solomons
Special Award - Health and Efficiency

2001
Artist - Svar Simpson
Campaigner for Sexual Freedom - Ana Lopes
Clothes Designer - Sophie Jonas
Craftmaster - Karin Scholz
Erotic Cabaret - Cat and Mouse
Event/Club - S/M Gay Nights at the Hoist
Film, Video - Digital Sex
Innovation of the Year - Jo King's London School of Striptease
Performance Artist - Rosie Lugosi
Erotic Photographer - Petter Hegre
Erotic Publication - Digital Diaries
Sex Worker - Mary-Anne Kenworthy
Striptease artist (Female) - Max
Striptease artist (Male) - Leather Ian
Web Site - What's Yours
Writer - Marilyn Jaye Lewis
Outsider Award - Maz Peri
Special Award - Lyndsay Honey

2002
 Artist: Carolyn Weltman
 Erotic Book: Baby Oil and Ice - striptease in East London, edited by Lara Clifton 
 Campaigner for Erotic Freedom: Ted Goodman
 Craft: Shiri Zinn
 Disability-Friendliness: ukfetish.info
 Documentary: My Body, My Business, A KEO films production for Channel 4
 Event/Club: SFC Conference 2002: Reclaiming Sex.
 Fashion Designer: Wayne
 Feature Film: Baise Moi Director: Virginie Despentes. Sex y Lucia, Director: Julio Medem
 Hardcore Video: Dark Angels (USA), Directed by Nic Andrews & produced by New Sensations
 Magazine: Deliciae Vitae
 Performance Artist: Cat & Mouse
 Photographer: Alva Bernadine
 Sex Toy: I Rub My Duckie
 Sex Worker: Rosie (Cambridge)
 Striptease Artists: Gypsy Joe (Male), Cannibal Clippa (Female)
 Website: Sally's Site
 Writer: Michael Perkins
 Lifetime Achievement: Burnel Penhau, also known as "Transformer" (1 June 1964 to 5 Aug 2002)
 Judges Award: Erich Von Gotha
 Outsiders Award: James Palmer

2003
Artist of the Year - Tom Sargent (London)
Campaigner of the Year - Paul Tavener (Portsmouth)
Event/Club of the Year - The Whoopee Club (London)
Fashion Designer of The Year - Miss Katie (London)
Film of the Year - Secretary (US)
Innovation of the Year - International Workshop Festival 2002 (London)
Lifetime Achievement - Charles Gatewood (San Francisco); Rockbitch (Luxemburg); Simon Spencer (Manchester)
Performance Artist of the Year - Tao Warriors (London)
Photographer of the Year - Mariano Vargas (Marbella)
Publication of the Year - Kink! (London)
Striptease Artist of the Year (Female) - Immodesty Blaize (London)
Striptease Artist of the Year (Male) - Walter (London)
Sex Worker of the Year - Seb Cox (London)
Website of the Year - www.ukrudegirl.com (United Kingdom)
Writer of the Year - Susannah Indigo (Denver)
Outsiders Award Winner - Ted O'Dwyer (London)

2004
Publication - Catherine Merriman
Fashion Designer of the Year - Hussy
Film of the Year - Zenra Ballet
Performance Artist of the Year - Mouse
Lifetime Achievement of the Year - Tomi Ungerer

2005
Artist of the Year - The Secret Museum
Independent Film of the Year - Made in Secret - the Story of the East Van Collective
Website of the Year - Melonfarmers - Watching the Censors Watch What We Watch

2006
Film of the Year 2006: Nomades by Jean-Daniel Cadinot
Volunteer of the Year - Fosit
Lifetime Achievement of the Year - Irena Ionesco

2007
Artist - Michael Forbes
Blog - Viviane's Sex Carnival
Campaigner - J.A.M. Montoya
Club - Club R.U.B.
Event - Discovering the Sensual Goddess Within
Fashion - Totally Trashed by Karin Helen, London
Film, Independent - Silken Sleeves
Film, Independent Comedy - Carry On Mouse
Film, Feature - Shortbus
Innovation - Abby Winters Website
Judge's Award - Max Emadi
Lifetime Achievement - Derek Cohen
Performance Artist - Ekaterina
Photographer - Christian Petersen
Pioneer - Taschen
Pioneer - Candida Royalle
Pioneer - Melanies
Pole Dancer - Franca
Porn Artist - Eva Vortex
Publication - Gender and Sexuality
Sex Worker, Female - Ariana Chevalier
Sex Worker, Male - Sleazy Michael
Striptease Artist, Female - Roxy
Striptease Artist, Male - Mat Fraser
Television Programme - Let's Talk Sex
Website - SkinMarvin.com
Writer - Mathilde Madden
Outsiders Award - Karen and Mark Hoffman
Outsiders Award - Nick Wallis
Outsiders Award - Want

2008
Campaigner of the Year - Meena Seshu
Event of the Year - The Love Art Laboratory
Politician of the Year - Lord Richard Faulkner
Politician of the Year - Baroness Sue Miller
Writer of the Year - James Lear
Tribute - Bob Flanagan (27 December 1952 – 4 January 1996)

2009
Campaigner of the Year - The Australian Sex Party
Female Striptease Artist of the Year - Minky Mix
Photographer of the Year - Victor Ivanovsky
Campaigner of the Year - Reverend David Gilmore

2010
 Academic - Dr. Antony Lempert
 Artist - Art Tart
 Blog - Dr Petra's Blog
 Campaigner - Clair Lewis
 Club and Event - Act Art
 Fashion - Prangsta
 Film, Feature - Uncle David
 Innovation - Ladies High Tea Pornography Society UK
 Lifetime Achievement - Sir Guy of The Tawsingham Community and The Other Pony Club
 Lifetime Achievement - Jo King
 Lifetime Achievement - Ian Jackson and Lesley Ann Sharrock
 Outsiders Award - Victoria McKenzie
 Performance Artist - Raymond-Kym Suttle & Gabriel Szlontai - Brokeback Disco Boys
 Performance Artist - Amelia Cavallo
 Photographer - Victor Ivanovsky
 Photographer - Sebastian Hyman
 Photographer - David Steinberg
 Pioneer - Reverend David Gilmore
 Poet - Ernesto Sarezale (aka The Naked Poet)
 Politician - Anna Arrowsmith
 Politician - Chris Davies
 Publication - The New Joy of Sex
 Sex Worker, Female - Pye Jakobsen
 Sex Worker, Male - Thierry Schaffauser
 Striptease Artist - Minky Mix
 Website - Saafe
 Writer - Jane Fae

2011
Pioneer of the Year - Luca Darkholme
Photographer of the Year - Daikich Amono
Sex Worker of the Year - Josh Brandon

2012
Campaigner of the Year - Brook Campaign for Sex and Relationship Education
Striptease Artist of the Year 2012: Edie Lamort
Illustrated Publication of the Year - Souvenir by RubiCANE
Written Publication of the Year - Madam — Prostitutes – Punters – Puppets by Becky Adams
Fashion Designer of the Year - Monsterlune (Estelle Riviere)
Female Sex Worker of the Year - Dolly

2013
Performance Artist - Mr Mistress
Striptease Artist - Jewel Inthelotus
Club/Event - Double R Club
Academic - Dr Meg Barker
Artist - Monica Cook
Blog - Slutever
Campaigner - Laura Agustín
Film - The Sessions
Innovation - Bottom Spankers (Bert Gilbert)
Lifetime Achievement - Hilary Spenceley
Outsiders Award - Anita Kataraumbe
Pioneer - Cindy Gallop
Photographer - Predrag Pajdic
Publication - Jungsheft
Sex Worker of the Year - Charlotte Rose
Website - Erotic Review
Writer - Brooke Magnanti (Sex Myths)
Sexual Therapist - Sue Newsome
Tabloid Scandal - Benedict Garrett

2014
Campaigner - Cari Mitchell
Devotion to the Cause (Special Award) - Laura Lee
Pioneer - Sex Workers Opera
Erotic Performance Artist - Dominic Master
Publicist/Writer - Frankie Mullin
Sex Worker - Nikita
Specialist - Annabel Newfield
Stripper - Lou Safire
Support Professional / Ally - National Ugly Mugs
Volunteer – Special Outsiders Award - Jamie Willmott

2015
 Activist Of The Year - Stacey Clare
 Special Jury Prize for International Work - COSWAS (Collective of Sex Workers and Supporters)
 Ally of the Year - Clare de Than
 Event of the Year - The Summer House Weekend
 Performance Artist of the Year - Rex Denial
 Pioneer of the Year - Laura Lee
 Publicist of the Year - Pandora Blake
 Sex Worker of the Year (joint) - Seani Love
 Sex Worker of the Year (joint) - Mistress Tytania
 Somatic Sex Educator of the Year - Dr. Betty Martin
 Striptease Artist of the Year - Sam Reynolds

2016
 Somatic Sex Educator of the Year - Deej Juventin
 Activist of the Year - Scottish Prostitutes' Education Project
 Ally of the Year - Georgina Perry
 Event of the Year - RIP Shoreditch
 Outsiders Volunteer of the Year - Vivien Abrahams
 Performer of the Year - Danny Ash
 Pioneer of the Year - Ellen Heed
 Publicist of the Year - Conner Habib
 Sex Worker of the Year - Saul Isbister
 Striptease Artist of the Year - The Stripping Shivas
 Multi Talent Award - Laura-Doe Harris
 Lifetime Achievement Award - Barbara Carrellas
 Lifetime Achievement Award - Dr. Joseph Kramer
 Lifetime Achievement Award - Kenneth Ray Stubbs, Ph.D

2017
Activist of the Year - Dan Glass
Ally of the Year - Amanda Gay Love
Event of the Year - The London Porn Film Festival
Performer of the Year - Ellie Mason
Pioneer of the Year - The Cocoa Butter Club
Publicist of the Year - Alix Fox & Dr Kate Lister (joint winners)
Sexual Service Provider of the Year - Matt-at-Lotus & Rosie Enorah Heart (joint winners)
Somatic Sexologist of the Year - Ruby May
Stripper of the Year - Tequila Rose
Volunteer of the Year Outsiders Award - Val Clarke
Lifetime Achievement Awards - John Constable aka John Crow

2018
Activist of the Year - Aderonke Apata
Ally of the Year - Open Barbers
Event of the Year - The Catwalk for Power, Resistance and Hope
Performer of the Year - Fran Bushe - Ad Libido
Pioneer of the Year - Mollena Williams-Haas
Publicist of the Year - Erika Moen & Juno Roche (joint winners)
Sexual Worker of the Year - Madame Caramel
Somatic Sexologist of the Year - Tami Kent
Stripper of the Year - Joana Nastari
Lifetime Achievement Awards - Dominic Ravies

2019
Activist of the Year - Carolina BloggerOnPole
Ally of the Year - The Consent Collective
Event of the Year - UK Black Pride (UKBP)
Performer of the Year - Chiyo Gomes
Pioneer of the Year - Florence Schechter
Publicist of the Year - Gigi Engle
Sexual Worker of the Year - Sir Claire Black
Somatic Sexologist of the Year - Caffyn Jesse
Stripper of the Year - Sasha Diamond
Outsiders Volunteer of the Year - Emma Buckett
Lifetime Achievement Awards - Michael Ross-Turner

References

External links

Night of the Senses website
I'm all for good, clean dirty fun, me Grayson Perry, The Times, 30 August 2006
"Erotic Awards 2013: Confronting the taboos of disabled sex"

Pornographic film awards
British pornography
British awards
Awards established in 1994
Free expression awards